Regina Charlotta Theodora Lund, known professionally as Regina Lund, is a Swedish celebrity, award-winning Actress, Swedish Grammy nominated Artist, Singer-Songwriter, poet, writer, model, comedian and awarded painter. Regina Lund is a well-known household name in Sweden for film, television, radio, and theatre, as well as musicals and dramas on stage. Soon after acting school, she played Ophelia in Shakespeare’s Hamlet directed by the eldest son of Ingmar Bergman, Jan Bergman, which toured throughout Sweden. Regina Lund has been famous for constantly creating and working both in underground and mainstream productions.

Early life
Born to director Christian Lund (1943–2007) and actress Sonja Lund (f. 1942) in Vaasa, Finland, while her parents were working there in theatre. Regina grew up in Gävle, Sweden with her grandparents. From the age of 10 to 18, Regina spent summers with family members in the United States and was an exchange student in Salt Lake City throughout her last year of high school. Her acting career began when she was 11.

Career
Regina started her acting career in a non-speaking role in the television movie Den nya människan in 1979, directed by her father. She made her big breakthrough as Laila Klang, a housewife in Tierp in the radio show Klang & Co in 1993 and as the secretary Mona in the television series Rederiet, a role she played between 1994–1995 and again in 2001. In 1995 Lund was awarded the Guldmasken (in English: The Golden Mask) award for Best female lead in a musical for her role in I hetaste laget.

In 2004, she was one of the hosts of Sommar, talking about her life and her career up to that point. In 2007 she performed the song "Rainbow star" in Melodifestivalen 2007 but was eliminated in the first round in one of the semifinals. She voiced the role of Gloria the Hippopotamus in the Swedish dubbed version of DreamWorks film Madagascar.

Lund launched her acting career in the 1996 film Harry & Sonja, where she played a lifeguard at a swimming pool with Stellan Skarsgård. She had the leading role in the 1999 thriller film Sjön. After that she had more leading roles in Hassel – Förgöraren and had a part in Once in a Lifetime (Livet är en schlager), a comedy film about the Eurovision Song Contest. In 2004 she appeared in the controversial film Kärlekens språk and she also starred in the film Göta kanal 2 – Kanalkampen.

Music
Lund made her musical debut on the 1997 Johan Norberg album 5 Hours 4 Months and a Day. Norberg later appeared on Lund's debut solo album Unique and also her second music album Year Zero, released in 1997 and 2000 respectively.

Theater and musical work
Lund made her stage debut in 1991 in Malmö as Curley's wife in John Steinbeck's Of Mice and Men. She also had the part of Ophelia in Jan Bergman's Hamlet at Riksteatern in Stockholm in 1992. The same year she acted as Beth in Sam Shepard's Den innersta lögnen (English: The Innermost Lie). The year after that she played a part in the musical I hetaste laget (English: Too Hot to Handle) at Cirkus, Stockholm.

In 1996, she acted as the character Lola in the play Blå Ängeln, and also had a role in Censorn in Gothenburg.

Personal life
Lund has a daughter, born in 1999. She was married to actor Jonas Malmsjö between 2000 and 2002. Between 2006 and 2008, she lived in Copenhagen. In 2013, Lund revealed to Aftonbladet newspaper that she had been diagnosed and operated for cancer in her breasts and lymph nodes. In early 2014, Lund revealed that she was cancer free.

Theater work
1992 – Hamlet – Ofelia
1993 – Häxjakten – Abigal
1994 – I hetaste laget
1995 – Moder Svea – ett äkta svenskt självmord
2003 – GG – Greta Garbo
2003 – Victor/Victoria
2008 – Blodsbröder –  Mrs Lyons
 2010 – Liket som visste för mycket – Maria Nylén (Dröse & Norberg)

Filmography
1971 – Badjävlar (TV film)
1979 – Den nya människan (TV film)
1986 – Studierektorns sista strid (TV series)
1989 – Kronvittnet (TV series)
1991 – Midsommar (TV film)
1992 – Kvällspressen (TV series)
1994 – SWIP (TV series)
1994-95/ 2001 – Rederiet (TV series)
1993 – Det uppdämda hatets bottenlösa bassänger (TV film)
1993 – Pariserhjulet (TV series)
1994 – Fallet Paragon (TV series)
1995 – Rena Rama Rolf (TV series)
1996 – Anna Holt (TV series)
1996 – Euroboy
1997 – Sjukan (TV series)
1998 – Teater
1998 – Ivar Kreuger (TV series)
1998 – Aspiranterna (TV series)
1999 – Nya lögner (TV film)
1999 – The Longest Journey
1999 – Sjön
2000 – Livet är en schlager
2003 – Solisterna
2004 – Hollywood
2004 – Kärlekens språk
2005 – Wallander – Luftslottet
2005 – Göta kanal 2 – kanalkampen
2006 – Isabella (TV series)
2008 – Jenny ger igen
2010 – Mammas pojke

Discography

Albums
1997 – Unique
2000 – Year Zero
2004 – Everybody's Darling
2006 – Förlåt! Nej, jag menar aj.
2011 – Living in Airports

Singles
1997 – "Unique" / "One Day Jesus"
1998 – "Silent Green" (inh. Stonebridge Radio Version, Red Mecca Remix, StoneBridge Full Version, Album Version)
2000 – "Miss Colourful" (inh. Miss Colourful, Johnny's Having a Breakdown)
2003 – "Önska" (Carlsohn feat. Regina Lund) (inh. Radiomix, Orkestermix, Klubbmix, Musikvideo)
2004 – "Too Small"
2007 – "Rainbow Star" (inh. Radio Version, Oscar Holter Remix, Karaoke Version)
2009 – "On the Waterfront" (w/ Raymond Watts)
2010 – "All Over My Body" (w/ Conny Bloom)
2011 – "In the Atmosphere"
2011 – "Living in Airports"
2011 – "Starlight" (w/Mmadcatz)

Bibliography
2005 – Diktsamlingen Förlåt! Nej, jag menar aj!
2009 – Romanen Nothing but the Veil
2011 – Diktsamlingen Laserstrålar

References

1967 births
Living people
People from Vaasa
Swedish actresses
Swedish women singers
Sommar (radio program) hosts
Swedish women radio presenters
Melodifestivalen contestants of 2007
Melodifestivalen contestants of 2006